Majjipeta is a village in Bheemunipatnam mandal of Visakhapatnam district in Andhra Pradesh, India.

References 

Villages in Visakhapatnam district